Mayaguana (from Taíno language Mayaguana, meaning "Lesser Midwestern Land") is the easternmost island and district of The Bahamas. Its population was 277 in the 2010 census.

It is a popular stopover for boaters en-route to the eastern Caribbean.

Etymology 
The indigenous Lucayan people named the island Mayaguana (or Mariguana) meaning "lesser mid-western land".

History
Mayaguana was inhabited by Lucayans prior to the arrival of the Spanish following 1492.

The Brazilian historian Francisco Adolfo de Varnhagen suggested in 1824 that Mayaguana is Guanahani, the first island visited by Christopher Columbus at his discovery of the Americas. His theory has found little support. Mayaguana apparently was the Lucayan name (meaning "Lesser Midwestern Land" ) for the island.

The first steamship to circumnavigate the globe, the Royal Navy sloop HMS Driver, wrecked on Mayaguana on 3 August 1861, 14 years after the completion of her epic voyage in 1847.

During NASA's Project Mercury and the Apollo program, the United States space program had a missile tracking station on what is now Mayaguana Airport. The station was used to help keep astronauts on course.  The Mayaguana Airport was built by US Army Engineers attached to the US Air Force. The airport was built as a runway for jet planes that would follow missiles fired from Cape Canaveral. Real-time sighting and photography was the best technology of the time for observing the flight of the missiles.

The Bahamian government has recently approved working with American investors MMC to turn Mayaguana into a "free trade zone," complete with tourism development of approximately 14% of the island. Actually, this is 14% of the total landmass but essentially most of the coastal region. The proposal was met with moderate resistance by Mayaguanians, who look forward to economic expansion but are unsure of what change is to come. This development is still in a planning phase and is trying to maintain the nature of the island as a quiet eco-tourist destination while still creating sustainable economic growth.

People

The largest settlement is Abraham's Bay (pop. 143) on the south coast; other settlements are the neighboring towns of Betsy Bay (pop. 44) and Pirate's Well (pop. 90) in the northwest with the population slowly decreasing. The uninhabited areas of Upper Point (north shore), Northeast Point, and Southeast Point are largely inaccessible by road.

Culture

In 2016, Mayaguana held its first annual regatta festival called the All Mayaguana Regatta. The festival focuses on the sailing competition, food, arts and music. Conchfest is also held as a replacement for the Abraham's Bay Homecoming in early August.

The least developed Bahamian island, Mayaguana has never really seen major growth largely due to the government taking little interest in the economy. However, the government has provided some locals with entry-level positions at various government offices. Others make a living by either fishing and farming.

Considered the most isolated Bahamian island, Mayaguana uses the country's mail boat system as its primary form of import and export. Mayaguana is visited once a week for delivery and pickup by M/V Lady Mathilda.

Food

Mayaguana is known for fresh sea food. Sea life regularly caught for commercial purposes include conch, grouper, spiny lobster, snappers and tuna. Marlin and bone fish found in Bahamian waters are fished for sporting activities only.

Environment

Mayaguana is known for its fertile soil, which is good for farming, and its woody terrain. Bahamian dry forests' hardwoods, common lignum-vitae (Guaiacum officinale), and holywood lignum-vitae (G. sanctum) can be found throughout the island. The island is home to several government nature reserves.

As the southeasternmost island in the Bahamian Commonwealth, Mayaguana is bordered to its east by deep waters of the Atlantic Ocean. Offshore, there are many underwater coral reefs, as well as shipwrecks.

Mayaguana is home to the Bahamian hutia, a rodent that was thought to be extinct until the mid-1960s, as well as Bahamian flamingos (Phoenicopterus ruber), Bartsch's iguanas, plovers, terns, and osprey. Nesting sea turtles can be found throughout the undeveloped northern part of the island. About 118 species of bird are found on the island, including two large brown booby colonies.

Tourism

Mayaguana remains one of the most pristine and untouched islands in the Bahamas. Yet the island – home to beautiful beaches, unique wildlife and world-class fishing – has never fully reached its development potential. Most tourists who visit do so for the unspoiled essence of the island. Visitors can also enjoy scuba diving, bonefishing, snorkeling, white-crowned pigeon hunting and bird watching. The eastern part of the island is a popular area for crabbing (catching local island crabs) and off-trail bikers.

Ecotourism is also a growing spectrum. Booby Cay is home to hundreds of iguanas indigenous only to Mayaguana. There is also an interesting species of booby birds that is also found on a separate cay on the northern side of Mayaguana. Blackwood Point, located in upper Pirates Well is where the Bahamian flamingo can be found feeding year round.

The island is accessible by the Mayaguana Airport (MYG), which is located southeast of Abraham's Bay and is visited by Bahamasair as well as private aircraft. New construction is set to take place at the Mayaguana Airport before the fourth quarter of 2017.

References

Further reading

External links

 Islands of the Bahamas: Mayaguana

Districts of the Bahamas
Islands of the Bahamas